Charlotte Napoléone Bonaparte (31 October 1802 – 2 March 1839) was the daughter of Joseph Bonaparte, the older brother of Emperor Napoleon I, and Julie Clary. She was active as an artist.

Life

After the fall of her uncle Emperor Napoleon in 1815, her father moved to America and lived in Philadelphia, Pennsylvania. Charlotte and her sister, however, stayed with their mother in Europe. They lived in Frankfurt and Brussels in 1815-1821, and then in Florence. 

She studied engraving and lithography in Paris with the artist Louis Léopold Robert, who is reputed to have fallen in love with her. 

Charlotte, known as the Countess de Survilliers, lived with her father in Philadelphia from December 1821 to August 1824. 

Charlotte married her first cousin Napoléon Louis, the second son of Louis Bonaparte and Hortense de Beauharnais, on 23 July 1826. She became a widow in 1831.

Artist
While in America, she sketched numerous landscapes including Passaic Falls, her father's "Point Breeze" estate, the town of Lebanon, and others, some of which were engraved for the book "Picturesque American Scenes" by Joubert. Extant landscape drawings by her include Passaic Falls, a view near Tuckerton, and Schooley's Mountain. She also painted portraits (Cora Monges, 1822; Emilie Lacoste, 1823) and exhibited her work at the Pennsylvania Academy of the Fine Arts.

Death
Charlotte reportedly died in childbirth. The father of her child was reportedly Count Potocki. 

Her tomb is in the Basilica of Santa Croce, Florence, Italy, and it says (paraphrased): Born Oct. 31, 1802, died 1839.

Legacy
Charlotte, her sister Zénaide (1801–1854), and their mother were painted by the French artist François Gérard, while their mother was Queen of Spain. Another French artist, the well-known Jacques-Louis David, painted a portrait of the two sisters; it shows them reading a letter from Philadelphia sent by their father.

Gallery

Ancestry

Sources

 E. Benezit, Dictionnaire critique et documentaire des Peintres, Sculpteurs, Dessinateurs et Graveurs (1966), vol. 1, p. 754, and vol. 7, p. 279. p 464
 Patricia Tyson Stroud, The Man Who Had Been King: The American Exile of Napoleon's Brother Joseph (Philadelphia: University of Pennsylvania Press, 2005), pp. 88–113.
 William H. Gerdts, Painting and Sculpture in New Jersey (Princeton, NJ: Van Nostrand, 1964), p. 56.

1802 births
1839 deaths
Deaths in childbirth
Charlotte Napoleone Bonaparte
People from Bordentown, New Jersey
People from Hunterdon County, New Jersey
Charlotte Napoleone Bonaparte
Daughters of kings